Masters of the Universe: The Power of He-Man is a horizontally scrolling shooter and action game designed for Intellivision by Mike Sanders and Jossef Wagner and published by Mattel in 1983. It is based on the multimedia franchise of the same name and marks the first video game in the series. Mattel released an Atari 2600 version under their M Network brand.

References

External links 

 
Masters of the Universe: The Power of He-Man at He-Man.org
Masters of the Universe: The Power of He-Man at AtariAge

1983 video games
Atari 2600 games
Horizontally scrolling shooters
Intellivision games
Masters of the Universe video games
Mattel video games
North America-exclusive video games
Single-player video games
Video games developed in the United States
Video games set on fictional planets